Slinky Dog Zigzag Spin (also known as Slinky Dog Spin) is a Caterpillar-style ride at Walt Disney Studios Park in France, Hong Kong Disneyland, and Shanghai Disneyland Park. The ride is part of Toy Story Playland in France, and Toy Story Land in Hong Kong and Shanghai. The France ride opened on August 17, 2010; the Hong Kong installation opened on November 17, 2011; and the Shanghai ride opened on April 26, 2018.

Attraction
At the heart of Toy Story Playland is the land's oldest character toy: an authentic "Collector's Edition" Slinky Dog, complete with original 1950s cardboard box.

This powered roller coaster is the tamest attraction in the land, simply offering a continuous, circular ride up and down a relatively gentle incline. Aimed primarily at a younger age group, it nevertheless provides enough fun and kitsch design to be appreciated by a wide demographic of visitors.

Entering a queue line formed out of Lincoln Logs building blocks, visitors eventually step inside the giant box itself, which has a retro-styled boardgame printed on its inside. The giant Slinky Dog train is connected end-to-end, travelling in a loop around a dog bowl filled with rubber bones and Andy's baseball. It builds up enough speed to provide a mild thrill which, combined with the quick rise and descent, provides a ride not dissimilar to Dumbo the Flying Elephant.

The layout takes advantage of the land's sloping elevation to create the illusion of being shrunk, especially when visitors stand at the foot of the ride, its enormous box towering above, surrounded by oversized grass.

See also
 Hong Kong Disneyland attraction and entertainment history
 2011 in amusement parks
 Scuttle's Scooters

References

Amusement rides introduced in 2010 
Amusement rides introduced in 2011 
Amusement rides introduced in 2018 
Walt Disney Studios Park
Hong Kong Disneyland
Shanghai Disneyland
Amusement rides manufactured by Intamin
Pixar in amusement parks
Toy Story Land
2010 establishments in France
2011 establishments in Hong Kong
2018 establishments in China